Victor Oh (Chinese: 胡子修, born June 10, 1949) is a Canadian senator from Ontario. He was appointed to the Senate on January 25, 2013.

Early life
Oh was born in Singapore. In 1978, he immigrated to Canada with his wife and children. Over the years, Oh became an entrepreneur and community leader in the city of Mississauga and the Greater Toronto area in Ontario. Much of his volunteer work focused on building bridges of understanding and collaboration across cultures as well as to helping newcomers from all over the world establish themselves and start their own businesses.

Recognition and awards

Oh has been recognized for his contributions to Ontario and Canada. He was awarded the Robert Boyne Memorial Award by the Peel Regional Police Services Board in 2007 and the Citation for Citizenship (now known as Canada's Citizenship Awards) by the Government of Canada in 2008 in recognition of his outstanding role in promoting the value of citizenship and helping newcomers to integrate into Canadian society. In 2010, Oh became the first Chinese-Canadian in 26 years to receive a Tribute Dinner by the Community Living Foundation of Mississauga. In 2011, Canadian Immigrant magazine named him one of the Top 25 Canadian Immigrant Award Winners.

Business career
Oh was the founding chairman of the Canada-China Business Communication Council and the former President of Wyford Holdings, a property development and management business. He was also a president of the Mississauga Chinese Business Association and a former co-chair of the Confederation of Greater Toronto Chinese Business Association.

Oh currently serves as a member of the Board of Governors of Sheridan College Institute of Technology and Advanced Learning.

Senate of Canada 

Oh is currently a member of the Standing Senate Committees on Foreign Affairs and International Trade, Agriculture and Forestry and National Security and Defence. He is also a member of the Special Senate Committee on the Arctic.

Oh is the Vice-Chair of the Canada-China Legislative Association and of the Canada-Japan Inter-Parliamentary Group in addition to a member of the Canada-Europe Parliamentary Association, the Canadian Section of ParlAmericas and the Canada-United States Inter-Parliamentary Group. He has also held executive positions in a number of parliamentary friendship groups including Canada-Bulgaria, Canada-Indonesia, Canada-Malaysia, Canada-Nordic-Baltic, Canada-Peru and Canada-Singapore.

In 2016, Senator Oh was the head of the Canadian parliamentary delegation at the 24th Annual Meeting of the Asia-Pacific Parliamentary Forum (APPF) held in Vancouver, British Columbia. On this same year, he joined the Parliamentary Network on the World Bank & International Monetary Fund, which provides a platform for parliamentarians from over 140 countries to advocate for increased accountability and transparency in International Financial Institutions and multilateral development financing.

Oh has also been involved in various initiatives to celebrate ethnic, religious, and cultural diversity in Canada.

Hazel McCallion, the former mayor of Mississauga, inspired Oh to get involved in public life. He notes that "her lifelong involvement with charitable work and her deep commitment to the public good was, and continues to be, a true testament of good leadership."

Conflict of interest investigation 
In December 2017, it was reported that Victor Oh accepted trips to China paid for by the Chinese government or pro-Beijing business groups. In February 2020, the Senate's ethics watchdog found that Victor Oh broke the conflict of interest and ethics code by accepting and then failing to disclose an all-expenses-paid trip to China for himself and two other senators. On June 18, the Senate Ethics and Conflict of Interest Committee recommended that Oh be censured, and asked for him to apologize to the Senate.

References

Living people
Canadian people of Singaporean descent
Canadian senators from Ontario
Conservative Party of Canada senators
1949 births
21st-century Canadian politicians
Canadian politicians of Chinese descent